The 2021–22 season was the 118th season in the existence of Standard Liège and the club's 100th consecutive season in the top flight of Belgian football. In addition to the domestic league, Standard Liège participated in this season's edition of the Belgian Cup.

Players

First-team squad

Out on loan

Pre-season and friendlies

Competitions

Overall record

Belgian First Division A

League table

Results summary

Results by round

Matches
The league fixtures were announced on 8 June 2021.

Belgian Cup

References

Standard Liège seasons
Standard Liège